The Alive Tribe is a 1997 Australian film directed by Stephen Amis and starring Craig Adams and Kate Atchenson. The film is about a young man who gets involved with eco-terrorists.

References

External links

Australian comedy films
1990s English-language films
1998 films
1990s Australian films